A by-election was held in the Dáil Éireann Tipperary South constituency in Ireland on 22 June 2000. It followed the death of  Labour Party Teachta Dála (TD) Michael Ferris on  20 March 2000.

The election was won by Independent South Tipperary County Councillor Séamus Healy, elected as part of Workers and Unemployed Action. The other candidates being Senator Tom Hayes standing For Fine Gael who would go on to win the 2001 Tipperary South by-election the following year, Barry O'Brien for Fianna Fáil and Ellen Ferris for the Labour Party who was Michael Ferris's window, Mary Heaney for Christian Solidarity and Raymond McInerney for Natural Law.

Result

See also
List of Dáil by-elections
Dáil constituencies

References

External links
https://electionsireland.org/result.cfm?election=1997B&cons=219&ref=120
http://irelandelection.com/election.php?elecid=96&constitid=48&electype=2
https://www.rte.ie/news/2000/0623/7577-ferris/

2000 in Irish politics
2000 elections in the Republic of Ireland
28th Dáil
By-elections in the Republic of Ireland
Elections in County Tipperary
June 2000 events in Europe